Irwin Lipnowski (born 2 May 1946), is a Canadian chess FIDE Master (FM), Associate Professor of University of Manitoba.

Biography
In the 1960s and 1970s Irwin Lipnowski was one of strongest Canadian chess players. He twice won Manitoba Junior Chess Championships (1960, 1962). Irwin Lipnowski participated many times in Canadian Chess Championships and achieved the best result in 1963, when he ranked in 6th place. In 1974, in Winnipeg he ranked in the 7th place in Pan American Chess Championship. In 1999, Irwin Lipnowski won Manitoba Open chess tournament.

Irwin Lipnowski played for Canada in the Chess Olympiad: 
 In 1976, at first reserve board in the 22nd Chess Olympiad in Haifa (+1, =4, -1).

Irwin Lipnowski played for Canada in the World Student Team Chess Championship:
 In 1971, at fourth board in the 18th World Student Team Chess Championship in Mayagüez (+1, =2, -2) and won team bronze medal.

Irwin Lipnowski has defended his PhD in London School of Economics. He worked as Associate Professor in University of Manitoba. Her specialization include microeconomics, industrial organization, public finance, game theory. Irwin Lipnowski is the author of many scientific works and publications. He has been awarded the Teaching Excellence Award (1999-2000).

References

External links

1946 births
Living people
Canadian chess players
Chess FIDE Masters
Alumni of the London School of Economics
Chess Olympiad competitors
20th-century chess players